The Duchess and the Devil is the third episode of the British television series Hornblower. The episode first aired on 24 February 1999 on ITV. The television story is loosely based on C. S. Forester's 1950 novel Mr. Midshipman Hornblower, chapter "Hornblower, the Duchess, and the Devil".

Plot
Acting Lieutenant Horatio Hornblower captures the French ship Le Reve. On , Captain Pellew orders Hornblower to sail his prize to Portsmouth with extremely important despatches, and to destroy them if necessary to keep them out of enemy hands. He then informs Hornblower that they have been invited to dinner with Sir Hew Dalrymple, the Governor of Gibraltar. Among the guests is the widowed Duchess of Wharfedale, who tells an entertaining story about how her father managed the Duke of Wharfedale's mills, which eventually led to her marrying the elderly Duke.

After the party, Pellew orders Hornblower to escort the Duchess home to England. As the journey starts, Le Reve is caught in a fog and sails into the middle of the Spanish fleet, which Hornblower erroneously believed was anchored at Cadiz. Hornblower tries to disguise the ship as a French ally, but a Spanish officer knows of Le Reve'''s capture, so the Spanish demand Hornblower's surrender. Before being boarded he reluctantly accepts the Duchess's offer to hide the despatches on her person rather than destroying them.

Hornblower and his crew are imprisoned in a fortress commanded by Don Alfredo de Massaredo, while the Duchess is hosted as Alfredo's guest. Hornblower is reunited with Archie Kennedy, who had previously been set adrift while unconscious by the vindictive Jack Simpson (as seen in episode one, "The Even Chance"). Kennedy is a physical and emotional wreck after prolonged torture following multiple escape attempts. He confides to Hornblower that he recognises the Duchess as a London actress, Katherine "Kitty" Cobham, who is pretending to be a member of the nobility in order to obtain passage to England. Alfredo arranges for her to travel aboard Almeria, a ship bound for Oporto in neutral Portugal. Hornblower's crew chafes under his order to bide their time until Kennedy, who speaks Spanish, is well enough to escape with them. The crew also resents Hornblower's friendship with the Duchess and the attention Alfredo pays him as the ranking officer. Alfredo hosts Hornblower, the Duchess, and a visiting French officer, Colonel de Vergesse at dinner. Vergesse indicates he knows the Duchess's true identity, and she seduces him so he will maintain his silence. When Hornblower questions her loyalty, she says she did what necessary to preserve her alias and perform her patriotic duty of safeguarding the despatches.

Some of the crew join hot-headed Midshipman Hunter in a premature escape attempt, and Hornblower orders the others to come to the aid of their shipmates. The escape fails, and Hunter is wounded. As the senior officer, Hornblower accepts blame and is forced to spend time in the same hole that previously held Kennedy, which is open to the elements and so small it does not permit a prisoner to sit or stand.

Soon after Hornblower's release from the hole, Alfredo and he witness a nighttime engagement between Almeria and Indefatigable. During a subsequent storm, Almeria founders on the rocky shoals. Hornblower volunteers himself and his crew to brave the rough seas and rescue those aboard Almeria, pledging his word of honor that he and his crew will return to the prison afterwards. Alfredo consents and a contrite Hunter insists on taking part, though his wound has not fully healed. Those saved include the Duchess and the injured captain of Almeria, whose rescue results in Hunter's death. They spend the rest of the night at sea in the rescue boat and are picked up by Indefatigable the next day.

On board Indefatigable, the Duchess returns the despatches to Pellew, who informs Hornblower that he has been promoted to lieutenant for his bravery in the fireship attack on Gibraltar (as seen in The Examination for Lieutenant). Hornblower asks permission to honor his pledge to Alfredo, and Pellew consents. Though Pellew considers Hornblower's men not bound by Hornblower's promise, when Pellew puts the question to them, they choose to return with Hornblower. Indefatigable departs for England with the Duchess as a passenger, and before she leaves Hornblower promises to keep her secret and she pledges him her permanent friendship. Soon after Hornblower and his men return to the prison, they are released by order of the King and Queen of Spain in recognition of their gallantry in saving the crew of Almeria''.

Cast

 Ioan Gruffudd as Acting Lieutenant / Lieutenant Horatio Hornblower
 Robert Lindsay as Captain Sir Edward Pellew
 Cherie Lunghi as Katherine “Kitty” Cobham / the Duchess of Wharfedale
 Christopher Fulford as Midshipman Hunter
 Ronald Pickup as Don Massaredo
 Jamie Bamber as Midshipman Archie Kennedy
 Jonathan Coy as Lieutenant Bracegirdle
 John Woodvine as Sir Hew Dalrymple
 Paul Copley as Matthews
 Sean Gilder as Styles
 Jean-Yves Berteloot as Etienne de Vergasse
 Simon Sherlock as Oldroyd
 Vincent S. Boluda as Spanish Lieutenant
 Jolyon Baker as Captain Joubert
 Colin MacLachlan as Master Bowles

References

External links
 

1999 television films
1999 films
1990s historical films
1990s war films
Films based on British novels
Films based on historical novels
Films based on military novels
Films set in Spain
Films set in the 1790s
French Revolutionary Wars films
Hornblower (TV series)
War television films